René Arnold Valero (August 15, 1930 – March 10, 2019) was an American prelate of the Roman Catholic Church who served as Auxiliary bishop of the Diocese of Brooklyn, New York from 1980 to 2005.

Biography
Born in Manhattan, New York City, Valero was ordained to the priesthood on June 2, 1956, for the Diocese of Brooklyn.

On October 4, 1980, he was named auxiliary bishop of the Brooklyn Diocese and titular bishop of Vicus Turris. He was consecrated bishop on November 24, 1980.

Valero retired on October 27, 2005.

Valero died on Sunday, March 10, 2019.

See also

References

External links
 Roman Catholic Diocese of Brooklyn Official Site

 

}

1930 births
2019 deaths
People from Manhattan
20th-century Roman Catholic bishops in the United States
Catholics from New York (state)
21st-century Roman Catholic bishops in the United States